Thorn Grove is an unincorporated community in eastern Knox County, Tennessee, United States. It is included in the Knoxville Metropolitan Statistical Area.

Geography
Thorn Grove is located adjacent to the Interstate 40 interchange at Midway Road, with I-40 connecting the community to Downtown Knoxville, and Midway Road connecting the community to Midway.

The interchange, along with tracts of land on Thorn Grove Pike and Midway Road were annexed by the City of Knoxville.

History
Through-out its existence, Thorn Grove has been predominantly rural, residents of the community have cited to keep preserve bucolic lifestyle despite the construction of I-40 in the mid-20th century.

Since its earliest proposals in the 2000s, Thorn Grove is the location of the long-argued Midway Business Park, a  commercial development project. 

The project, blocked by a 2008 lawsuit, was eventually approved for construction in 2015 by the Knox County Commission. In late 2018, the business park broke ground, with a estimated completion date of its first phase in mid-2020.

The first phase of the Midway Business Park is expected to have the potential to create an estimated 1,800 to 2,000 jobs in the region.

References

Unincorporated communities in Tennessee
Unincorporated communities in Knox County, Tennessee
Knoxville metropolitan area